Dâw or Kamã may refer to:

 Dâw people, an indigenous people of the Amazon
 Dâw language, the language spoken by the Dâw people